The Aerospace Research Institute (ARI) is a public advanced research institute founded in 1999 in Tehran, Iran.

Designing, manufacturing and launching four generations of space sounding rockets (eight sounding payloads)
Manufacturing and testing  the cold gas propulsion system
Identification of standards used in the designing, manufacturing and testing of space equipment
Designing and manufacturing the fixed flight simulator for the “Iran-140” airliner
Codification of the  national comprehensive document for aerospace development
Designing and construction of  the microgravity simulator
Conceptual design of an orbiting spacecraft carrying the living organism
 Aerospace applications in environmental studies and environmental remote sensing.

Furthermore, more than 500 completed and 156 ongoing research projects are being carried out currently, entitled:

Designing, construction and testing the first generation of suborbital manned spacecraft.
Telemetry conceptual design for the altitude of 250  km
Designing, manufacturing and testing the recovery system for a 500 kg payload.
Dynamic analysis of the astronaut’s Body for suborbital spaceflights
Feasibility study of the attitude control system for sounding rockets
Designing, manufacturing and testing “the moving- mass control actuator”

References 

Educational institutions established in 1999
Research institutes in Iran
Space program of Iran
Science and technology in Iran
Scientific organisations based in Iran
1999 establishments in Iran